Tygra is a fictional character from the ThunderCats franchise. The character is portrayed by Peter Newman in the 1985 ThunderCats TV series and Matthew Mercer in the 2011 ThunderCats TV series. In the first TV series, Tygra is known as the ThunderCat architect and scientist. In the second one, the writers modified some of the characters and Tygra became the adoptive brother of Lion-O. The character also appeared in several comic book series and many various figures based on the character were produced by various manufacturers.

1985 series

Tygra is a staunch, level-headed warrior. Based on the tiger, Tygra is known as the ThunderCat architect and scientist. He is the one Lion-O often turns to as second-in-command and for counsel. He is responsible for the design of ThunderCat structures on Third Earth—the Cat’s Lair and the Tower of Omens. Patient, analytic and calm, Tygra is the most quiet ThunderCat, and usually considers every part of the problem before making a decision.

He is gifted with "mind-power"—the ability to create lifelike illusions in other people’s minds; he used this for Lion-O's Anointment Trial, but it puts a great strain on him. He uses a whip-like bolas in combat, with which he can render himself invisible to the naked eye.

In the episode "All That Glitters", Lion-O instructs Tygra, "If I do not return, you will be the new Lord of the ThunderCats." This verifies that Tygra is second-in-command. Tygra's weakness is that he is not able to swim when not invisible; also, Tygra has shown to be easily influenced by external stimuli more than any other ThunderCat ("The Garden of Delights", "Turgamar the Tuska" and "Crystal Canyon"); he claimed to be shy as a kid.

2011 series

In the 2011 cartoon, Tygra's reimagined as Lion-O's adopted older brother and the two of them often have sibling rivalries over speed and strength and Cheetara's attention until she and Tygra become an official couple. Tygra is a user of magic and an expert marksman. Tygra was much less obedient to his brother (if at all) until the Trials of Lion-O parts 1 and 2, mainly because he felt that he should've been the Lord of the ThunderCats and not Lion-O. But after Lion-O 'dies' and undergoes his trials, Tygra becomes the new Lord of the ThunderCats/King, he realizes the pressure and responsibilities of being in that position, and realizes that Lion-O's the true king. Tygra also develops a greater respect and appreciation for his younger brother as well.

ThunderCats Roar

In the 2020 iteration of ThunderCats, Tygra is a mentor to Lion-O.

Analysis
Where creators Ted Wolf and Leonard Starr described Panthro's character as being based on "strength" and Cheetara's character as being based on "speed", Tygra's character was described as being based on "integrity".

In an interview with IGN, Michael Jelenic noted "I guess 'The Scientist' is what a lot of fans call him. He was someone we had a lot of concern about because he, unlike everyone else, was someone people might say didn't 'pop' as much. So the way we addressed that was to get away from him being the architect, or the scientist, of the series and tried to expand on his character. And the way we did that was we made him the adopted brother of Lion-O." In this series, during his whole life, Tygra was in his younger brother's shadow and it created sibling rivalries. Reviewer noted that it is "potent seeds for an eventual villainous turn.".

To add to Tygra's dark jealousy issues, creators used a love triangle between Tygra, Lion-O and Cheetara. Jelenic explained that "When we were very early in development, we pitched the show to Peter Roth, the President of Television for Warner Brothers, and the love triangle was the one thing he cued in on immediately. He said, 'Let's get a triangle going between these three characters' and he's obviously a guy who knows what he's doing. So that became a very important part of the story."

Reception
The character has received a mostly positive reception from critics. Comic Book Resources ranked the character among 7th Best thing about ThunderCats. io9 ranked Tigra 12th best thing about ThunderCats.

References

Anthropomorphic animal characters
Fictional adoptees
Fictional architects
Fictional characters who can turn invisible
Fictional characters who have mental powers
Fictional characters who use magic
Extraterrestrial characters in television
Fictional humanoids
Fictional princes
Fictional refugees
Fictional royalty
Fictional scientists
Fictional tigers
Fictional whip users
Male characters in animated series
Television characters introduced in 1985
ThunderCats